Boettner is a German surname. Notable people with the surname include:

 Juan Max Boettner, Paraguayan medical doctor and musical composer
 Loraine Boettner, American theologian, teacher, and author
 Luis Oscar Boettner, Paraguayan chess player

Germanic-language surnames